Mohamed Saad Shehata (born 8 February 1961) is an Egyptian footballer. He played in three matches for the Egypt national football team in 1990. He was also named in Egypt's squad for the 1990 African Cup of Nations tournament.

References

External links
 

1961 births
Living people
Egyptian footballers
Egypt international footballers
1990 African Cup of Nations players
Place of birth missing (living people)
Association footballers not categorized by position